The 2003 Missouri Valley Conference men's soccer season was the 13th season of men's varsity soccer in the conference.

The 2003 Missouri Valley Conference Men's Soccer Tournament was hosted by the Missouri Valley Conference and won by SMU.

Teams

MVC Tournament

See also 

 Missouri Valley Conference
 Missouri Valley Conference men's soccer tournament
 2003 NCAA Division I men's soccer season
 2003 in American soccer

References 

Missouri Valley Conference
2003 NCAA Division I men's soccer season